"Boom Blast" is a single from British grime artist Wiley. It is the second single released from his eighth album Evolve Or Be Extinct (2012). It was released on 16 January 2012 for digital download.

Music video 
The music video was uploaded to YouTube on 9 January 2012.

Track listings
Digital download
 "Boom Blast" (Radio Edit) - 3:34

Digital download - EP
 "Boom Blast" - 3:34
 "Boom Blast" (Sticky Remix) - 3:49
 "Boom Blast" (Herner Werzog Remix) - 4:01
 "Boom Blast" (Alex D Remix) - 4:52
 "Boom Blast" (Sticky Instrumental Remix) - 3:49
 "Boom Blast" (Instrumental) - 3:34

Credits and personnel 
 Lead vocals – Wiley
 Producer – Wiley
 Lyrics – Richard Cowie
 Label: Big Dada

Chart performance

Release history

References 

2012 singles
Wiley (musician) songs
2011 songs
Songs written by Wiley (musician)